Matthias Solerio (born 1 November 1992) is an Italian football player.

Club career
He made his professional debut in the Lega Pro (Serie C) for Giana Erminio on 5 September 2014 in a game against Lumezzane. On 31 January 2017 Solerio was signed by Avellino on loan, with an obligation to sign him outright at the end of season. He signed a 2-year contract in June 2017. On 10 July 2017 Solerio left for Reggina.

On 13 July 2018 Solerio was signed by re-established Serie C club Vicenza. He was released from his Vicenza contract by mutual consent on 31 January 2019.

On 21 February 2019, he returned to Giana Erminio until the end of the 2018–19 season.

On 16 September 2020, he signed a one-year contract with Pistoiese.

References

External links
 
 

1992 births
People from Cernusco sul Naviglio
Footballers from Lombardy
Living people
Italian footballers
U.S. Avellino 1912 players
U.C. AlbinoLeffe players
L.R. Vicenza players
A.S. Giana Erminio players
U.S. Pistoiese 1921 players
Serie B players
Serie C players
Association football defenders
Sportspeople from the Metropolitan City of Milan